Jerzy Bielecki  may refer to:

 Jerzy Bielecki (prisoner) (1921–2011), Polish social worker who escaped Auschwitz successfully, received the Righteous Among the Nations award
 Jerzy Bielecki (politician) (born 1969), Polish politician

See also
Bielecki (surname)